The Force M.D.s are an American R&B vocal group that was formed in 1981 in Staten Island, New York. Although the group has old school hip hop roots, it is perhaps best known for two tunes that are widely considered 1980s quiet storm classics, "Tender Love" and "Love Is a House". They are considered major forerunners of the new jack swing movement.

History

Origins 
The band was originally named The L.D.s, and then became the Force MCs, but ultimately preferred the name Force MDs, which stood for Musical Diversity. Though the group was not quite always as recognizable as other New York R&B acts when it first started, they were among the first R&B vocal groups to intermix doo-wop-affected singing with and sometimes over hip-hop beats.

The group was composed of brothers Stevie D., Antoine "T.C.D." (February 3, 1963 – January 18, 1998), and Rodney "Khalil" Lundy, and their uncle Jessie Lee Daniels (July 4, 1963 – January 4, 2022). Later, friends Trisco Pearson (October 23, 1962 – September 16, 2016) and Charles "Mercury" Nelson (December 19, 1964 – March 9, 1995) from the Mariners Harbor housing projects joined the group.

Performing and signing with a record label
The group began performing on Times Square, New York City street corners and during trips on the Staten Island ferry. After the L.D.s connected with DJ Dr. Rock (Roger Daniels) they then performed as "Dr. Rock & the Force MCs." The group was discovered by hip hop promoter Vansilk in summer 1981. The three members were Dr. Rock, Stevie D. and Mercury. In collaboration with Dr. Rock, the group continued to perfect their unique sound, which was unusual at the time: a fusion of doo-wop harmonies and hip-hop that involved singing, rapping and group member's "human beatbox" melodies at underground hip hop shows. They gained even more credibility and respect from local fans after competing in an emcee lyrical battle against the well known Cold Crush Brothers from the Bronx in 1983.

By 1984, the group signed with Tommy Boy Records, and they had developed into a quiet storm/contemporary R&B group, with its top-ten R&B hit, "Tears", from the debut album, Love Letters. (With the exception of their first album, the group was the first act on Tommy Boy to have major-label distribution through its then-parent Warner Bros. Records.)

Success 
The group produced a collection of R&B hits throughout the 1980s, and received overwhelming commercial success from the Jimmy Jam and Terry Lewis-penned love song "Tender Love" from their second album, 1985's Chillin'. The song was featured in the 1985 feature film and soundtrack Krush Groove, and proved to be a success, peaking at No. 10 in the Billboard Hot 100 chart, becoming an instant R&B classic after it stayed on the chart for 19 weeks. "Tender Love" was also one of the tracks that helped Jam & Lewis garner a Grammy Award for Producer of the Year. The song "Itchin' for a Scratch" was performed by the group in the 1985 feature film Rappin', and was also part of the soundtrack.

In 1987 they finally scored their first R&B #1 hit, "Love Is a House," from their third album, Touch & Go.

Waning popularity and member changes 
By the late 1980s the group's popularity began to wane. A fourth album, Step to Me, was released in 1990, which featured record production by Full Force, Marley Marl, Monte Moir (of the band The Time), and others. Members Pearson and Nelson left soon afterward, replaced by original member Rodney "Khalil" Lundy (who had initially left the band early in their career) and new member Shawn Waters. The group then released the album Moments in Time in 1994, but failed to chart or produce any hits. In 1996 the group appeared on several tracks on the Ghostface Killah album Ironman.

Deaths in the group and a last reunion
Three of the group's members died within five years of each other: Nelson suffered a fatal heart attack in 1995; former collaborator DJ Dr. Rock died suddenly of AIDS in 1996; and in 1998, Antoine Lundy died of Lou Gehrig's disease.

The remaining members returned with a comeback album, The Reunion, in 2000, but it failed to chart or register any hits.

Damen Heyward, a native of The Bronx who has toured with artists such as Joe, left the group to join his brother Lance Heyward, and two cousins Jeraude Jackson and Steve Gray, to form the group 4 By Four in 1987. The group released their first and only self-titled debut album under Capitol Records that year. Their album had little fanfare but charted hits such as "Come Over" which was written by Ready for the World lead singer Melvin Riley, "Want You for My Girlfriend" and "Don't Put the Blame on Me". 4 By Four quietly disbanded after the release of their album and a live appearance on an episode of Soul Train, where they performed "Want You for My Girlfriend" and "Don't Put the Blame on Me", and undertook an interview with Don Cornelius.

Trisco Pearson died on September 16, 2016, at age 53, after a battle with stage 4 cancer. His death was announced by Bow Legged Lou of Full Force. Jessie Daniels died on January 4, 2022, at the age of 58.

Legacy 
 The song "Tender Love" has been sampled in the 1996 Bone Thugs-n-Harmony hit "Days of Our Livez", and a number of current musicians have covered the song, including Alicia Keys, The Backstreet Boys, Kelly Rowland, Marques Houston and Marsha Ambrosius.
 In an interview in 2009 U.S. President Barack Obama highlighted the band among other artists included in his Air Force One iPod playlist when he travels.
 On April 8, 2010, the newly reformed Force MD's made their first national television appearance in over a decade on BET's The Mo'Nique Show.
 A documentary film titled The Force M.D.s Relived was shot recently, but the release date for a DVD is unknown at the moment.
 On September 9, 2015, they were featured on an episode of TV One's Unsung.

Members 
 Zieme Capers
 Stevie D. (Stevie D. Lundy)
 Khalil (Rodney Lundy)

Former members 
 T.C.D. (Antoine Lundy) (died 1998)
 Mercury (Charles Nelson) (died 1995)
 DJ Dr. Rock
 Shawn Waters
 Trisco (Trisco Pearson) (died 2016)
 Jessie D. (Jessie Lee Daniels) (died 2022)
 Damen Heyward

Discography

Studio albums

Compilation albums

Singles
{| class="wikitable" style="text-align:center;"
|-
! rowspan="2"| Year
! rowspan="2"| Single
! colspan="5"| Peak chart positions
! rowspan="2"| Album
|- style="font-size:smaller;"
! width="35"| US
! width="35"|USR&B
! width="35"|USA/C
! width="35"| CAN
! width="35"| UK
|-
| rowspan="2"| 1984
| style="text-align:left;"| "Let Me Love You"
| —
| 49
| —
| —
| —
| style="text-align:center;" rowspan="4"| Love Letters
|-
| style="text-align:left;"| "Tears"
| 102
| 5
| —
| —
| —
|-
| rowspan="3"| 1985
| style="text-align:left;"| "Forgive Me Girl"
| —
| 49
| —
| —
| 93
|-
| style="text-align:left;"| "Itchin' for a Scratch"
| 105
| 13
| —
| —
| —
|-
| style="text-align:left;"| "Tender Love"
| 10
| 4
| 2
| 9
| 23
| style="text-align:center;" rowspan="3"| Chillin'''
|-
| rowspan="3"| 1986
| style="text-align:left;"| "Here I Go Again" 
| —
| 18
| —
| —
| 98
|-
| style="text-align:left;"| "One Plus One"
| —
| 29
| —
| —
| —
|-
| style="text-align:left;"| "I Wanna Know Your Name"
| —
| 21
| —
| —
| —
| style="text-align:center;" rowspan="1"| Non-album single
|-
| rowspan="2"| 1987
| style="text-align:left;"| "Love Is a House"
| 78
| 1
| 38
| —
| 97
| style="text-align:center;" rowspan="3"| Touch and Go|-
| style="text-align:left;"| "Touch and Go"
| —
| 10
| —
| —
| —
|-
| rowspan="2"| 1988
| style="text-align:left;"| "Couldn't Care Less"
| —
| 23
| —
| —
| —
|-
| style="text-align:left;"| "Deep Check"
| —
| 66
| —
| —
| —
| style="text-align:center;" rowspan="1"| Non-album single
|-
| rowspan="1"| 1989
| style="text-align:left;"| "Float On" (with Stetsasonic)
| —
| 56
| —
| —
| —
| style="text-align:center;" rowspan="1"| In Full Gear|-
| rowspan="2"| 1990
| style="text-align:left;"| "Are You Really Real?
| —
| 23
| —
| —
| —
| style="text-align:center;" rowspan="2"| Step to Me|-
| style="text-align:left;"| "Somebody's Crying"
| —
| 34
| —
| —
| —
|-
|| 1992
| style="text-align:left;"| "Your Love Drives Me Crazy"
| —
| 78
| —
| —
| —
| style="text-align:center;" rowspan="1"| Touch and Go|-
| style="text-align:center;" colspan="8"| "—" denotes the single failed to chart or was not released
|}

Filmography
 1985: Rappin' 1989: Limit Up''

Cover version
One of their songs "Tender Love" was covered by Jordan Knight, Kenny Thomas, Usher, Uncle Sam, Alicia Keys and Meshell Ndegeocello.

References

Further reading
 Ebony
 Hip Hop in America: A Regional Guide
 Staten Island Advance
 Blues & Soul

External links
 [ The Force M.D.'s] at AllMusic
 The Force M.D.'s at Discogs

American soul musical groups
African-American musical groups
People from Staten Island
American street performers
Tommy Boy Records artists
Musical groups established in 1981
1981 establishments in New York City
Musical groups from Staten Island